Dauria was a Russian regional airline based in Chita which also carried out aerial work and aircraft maintenance. It went bankrupt in 2010 with debts of over 31 million roubles.

Destinations

Before bankruptcy, Dauria flew to:

 Irkutsk
 Chara
 Chita (Kadala Airport)

Fleet

Six partially dismantled Antonov An-2 aircraft were sold at auction in 2008 with the remaining two Antonov An-24 aircraft sold by the bailiffs in 2010.

The airline had previously operated Antonov An-26 aircraft.

References

Defunct airlines of Russia
1997 establishments in Russia
Airlines established in 1997
Airlines disestablished in 2010
Companies based in Zabaykalsky Krai